Highway 89 (AR 89, Ark. 89, and Hwy. 89) is a highway in the central part of the U.S. state of Arkansas.

Route description
AR 89's southern terminus is at an intersection with U.S. Highway 70 (US 70) near the western end of Lonoke. Within Cabot, it serves as a portion of two major commercial thoroughfares—first as South Pine Street from city limits into downtown, then turning westward as West Main Street.

From there, it travels south  then turns west again traveling approximately  before continuing as Lollie Road.

Future improvements
Within the Mayflower area, the highway is slated for a significant realignment to include a new overpass over the Union Pacific Railroad line, a $26.3 million project in planning since 1983. A resolution for shared financing of the overpass and realignment — which will also remove concurrency with AR 365 in the city and partially run back into unincorporated Faulkner County — was passed by the Mayflower city council in 2018, entering the city into partnership with the Arkansas Department of Transportation, Faulkner County, and the regional governmental council Metroplan. A groundbreaking for construction of the new pathway was held on May 25, 2021. Upon expected completion of the project in fall 2022, the highway's current alignment west of AR 365 will be ceded to the City of Mayflower.

Major intersections

Lonoke spur

Highway 89 Spur is a former spur route in Lonoke.  in length, it was established in 1966 and deleted from the state highway system in 2014.

Major intersections

See also

References

External links

089
Transportation in Faulkner County, Arkansas
Transportation in Pulaski County, Arkansas
Transportation in Lonoke County, Arkansas